was one of the best table tennis players worldwide from 1966 to 1974.

Table tennis career
From 1966 until 1974 he won five gold medals at world championships and two golds at the Asian Games.

In total he won ten World Championship medals His mixed doubles partners were Noriko Yamanaka and Yasuko Konno respectively and his men's doubles partners were Mitsuru Kono and Tokio Tasaka.

Hasegawa was a famous exponent of heavy topspin forehand attack, combined with lob defence. He used a modified shakehands grip with the index finger pointing down the center of the blade. This made his backhand a little awkward for fast attack, so even though a shakehander his tactics were similar to the Japanese penholders with wonderful footwork.

Hasegawa died while felling trees near his home and was buried under a tree.

See also
 List of table tennis players
 List of World Table Tennis Championships medalists

References 

Japanese male table tennis players
1947 births
2005 deaths
People from Seto, Aichi
Asian Games medalists in table tennis
Table tennis players at the 1966 Asian Games
Table tennis players at the 1974 Asian Games
Asian Games gold medalists for Japan
Asian Games silver medalists for Japan
Medalists at the 1966 Asian Games
Medalists at the 1974 Asian Games
World Table Tennis Championships medalists
Aichi Institute of Technology alumni